The 2010 Bilderberg Conference took place June 3–6 in Sitges, Spain, at Hotel Dolce.

Agenda

 Current Events: North Korea, Iran and Non-Proliferation 
 Global Cooling: Implications of Slow Economic Growth 
 The Growing Influence of Cyber Technology 
 Is Financial Reform Progressing? 
 US and European Fiscal and Financial Challenges 
 The European Union and the Crisis of the Euro 
 Promises of Medical Science 
 Energy's Promises and Challenges 
 Security in a Proliferated World 
 Social Networking: From the Obama Campaign to the Iranian Revolution 
 Europe-US: A New Approach 
 Pakistan, Afghanistan and the Region 
 Can We Feed the World?

Delegates (alphabetical)
 Josef Ackermann, chairman of the management board and the group executive committee, Deutsche Bank AG
 Marcus Agius, chairman, Barclays Bank PLC
 César Alierta, chairman and CEO, Telefónica
 Joaquín Almunia, commissioner, European Commission
 Roger C. Altman, chairman, Evercore Partners Inc.
 Sonia Arrison, author and policy analyst
 Urban Bäckström, director general, Confederation of Swedish Enterprise
 Francisco Pinto Balsemão, chairman and CEO, IMPRESA, S.G.P.S.; former prime minister
 Franco Bernabè, CEO, Telecom Italia S.p.A.
 Carl Bildt, Minister of Foreign Affairs
 Antti Blåfield, senior editorial writer, Helsingin Sanomat
 Ana Patricia Botín, executive chairman, Banesto
 Svein Richard Brandtzæg, CEO, Norsk Hydro ASA
 Oscar Bronner, publisher and editor, Der Standard
 Ruşen Çakir, journalist from Turkey
 Gordon Campbell, premier of British Columbia
 Jaime Carvajal Urquijo, managing director, Advent International
 Henri de Castries, chairman of the management board and CEO, AXA
 Juan Luis Cebrián, CEO, PRISA
 Gustavo A. Cisneros, chairman and CEO, Cisneros Group of Companies
 Edmund Clark, president and CEO, TD Bank Financial Group
 Timothy C. Collins, senior managing director and CEO, Ripplewood Holdings, LLC
 Fulvio Conti, CEO and general manager, Enel SpA
 George A. David, chairman, Coca-Cola H.B.C. S.A.
 Etienne Davignon, vice chairman, Suez-Tractebel
 Anders Eldrup, CEO, DONG Energy
 John Elkann, chairman, Fiat S.p.A.
 Thomas Enders, CEO, Airbus SAS
 José M. Entrecanales, chairman, Acciona
 Ulrik Federspiel, vice president of global affairs, Haldor Topsøe A/S
 Martin S. Feldstein, George F. Baker Professor of Economics, Harvard University
 Niall Ferguson, Laurence A. Tisch professor of history, Harvard University
 Heinz Fischer, federal president of Austria
 Paul Gallagher, attorney general
 Bill Gates, co-chair, Bill & Melinda Gates Foundation and chairman, Microsoft Corporation
 Philip H. Gordon, assistant secretary of state for European and Eurasian Affairs
 Donald E. Graham, chairman and CEO, The Washington Post Company
 Karel De Gucht, commissioner, European Commission
 Damla Gürel, special adviser to the president on EU affairs
 Victor Halberstadt, professor of economics, Leiden University; former honorary secretary general of Bilderberg Meetings
 Richard C. Holbrooke, special representative for Afghanistan and Pakistan
 Jan Hommen, chairman, ING Group
 Robert D. Hormats, under secretary for economic, energy and agricultural affairs
 Jan Huyghebaert, chairman of the board of directors, KBC Group
 James A. Johnson, vice chairman, Perseus, LLC
 Jyrki Katainen, minister of dinance
 John M. Keane, senior partner, SCP Partners
 John Kerr, member, House of Lords; deputy chairman, Royal Dutch Shell plc.
 Henry Kissinger, chairman, Kissinger Associates, Inc.
 Klaus Kleinfeld, chairman and CEO, Alcoa
 Mustafa V. Koç, chairman, Koç Holding A.Ş.
 Henry R. Kravis, founding partner, Kohlberg Kravis Roberts & Co.
 Marie-Josée Kravis, senior fellow, Hudson Institute, Inc.
 Neelie Kroes, commissioner, European Commission
 Eric S. Lander, president and director, Broad Institute of Harvard and MIT
 Anne Lauvergeon, chairman of the executive board, AREVA
 Bernardino León, secretary general, Office of the Spanish Prime Minister
 Peter Löscher, chairman of the board of Management, Siemens AG
 Birger Magnus, chairman, Storebrand ASA
 Peter Mansbridge, chief correspondent, Canadian Broadcasting Corporation
 Jessica T. Mathews, president, Carnegie Endowment for International Peace
 Frank McKenna, deputy chair, TD Bank Financial Group
 John Micklethwait, editor-in-chief, The Economist
 Thierry de Montbrial, president, French Institute for International Relations
 Mario Monti,  president, Universita Commerciale Luigi Bocconi
 Dambisa F. Moyo, economist and author
 Craig Mundie, chief research and strategy officer, Microsoft Corporation
 Egil Myklebust, former chairman of the board of directors SAS, Norsk Hydro ASA
 Moisés Naím, editor-in-chief, Foreign Policy
 Queen Beatrix of the Netherlands
 Juan María Nin Génova, president and CEO, La Caixa
 Poul Nyrup Rasmussen, former prime minister
 John Oldham, national clinical lead for quality and productivity
 Jorma Ollila, chairman, Royal Dutch Shell plc
 Peter R. Orszag, director, Office of Management and Budget
 Tuncay Özilhan, chairman, Anadolu Group
 Tommaso Padoa-Schioppa, former minister of finance; president of Notre Europe
 George Papaconstantinou, minister of finance, Greece
 Sean Parker, managing partner, Founders Fund
 Frank H. Pearl, chairman and CEO, Perseus, LLC
 Richard Perle, resident fellow, American Enterprise Institute for Public Policy Research
 Ignacio Polanco, chairman, Grupo PRISA
 Robert Prichard, president and CEO, Metrolinx
 Bernard Ramanantsoa, dean, HEC Paris Group
 Paulo Rangel, member, European Parliament
 Heather Reisman, chair and CEO, Indigo Books & Music Inc.
 Lars Renström, president and CEO, Alfa Laval
 Alexander Rinnooy Kan, chairman, Social and Economic Council of the Netherlands (SER)
 Gianfelice Rocca, chairman, Techint
 Matías Rodriguez Inciarte, executive vice chairman, Grupo Santander
 Charlie Rose, producer, Rose Communications
 Robert E. Rubin, co-chairman, Council on Foreign Relations; former secretary of the Treasury
 Suzan Sabanci Dinçer, chairman of Akbank
 Paolo Scaroni, CEO, Eni S.p.A.
 Eric Schmidt, CEO and chairman of the board, Google
 Rudolf Scholten, member of the board of executive directors, Oesterreichische Kontrollbank AG
 Olaf Scholz, vice chairman, SPD
 Josette Sheeran, executive director, United Nations World Food Programme
 Javier Solana Madariaga, former secretary general, Council of the European Union
 Queen Sofía of Spain 	
 James B. Steinberg, deputy secretary of state
 Björn Stigson, president, World Business Council for Sustainable Development
 Lawrence H. Summers, director, National Economic Council
 Peter Sutherland, chairman, Goldman Sachs International
 Martin Taylor, chairman, Syngenta International AG
 Fernando Teixeira dos Santos, minister of state and finance
 Peter A. Thiel, president, Clarium Capital Management, LLC
 Loukas Tsoukalis, president of ELIAMEP
 Gertrude Tumpel-Gugerell, member of the executive board, European Central Bank
 Christine A. Varney, assistant attorney general for antitrust
 Daniel Vasella, chairman, Novartis AG
 Paul A. Volcker, chairman, Economic Recovery Advisory Board
 Peter Voser, CEO, Royal Dutch Shell plc
 Björn Wahlroos, chairman, Sampo plc
 Francis A. Waldvogel, chairman, Novartis Venture Fund
 Jacob Wallenberg, chairman, Investor AB
 Nout Wellink, president of De Nederlandsche Bank
 Bing West, author
 Shirley Williams, member of the House of Lords
 James D. Wolfensohn, chairman, Wolfensohn & Company of LLC
 José Luis Rodríguez Zapatero, prime minister of Spain
 Dieter Zetsche, chairman of Daimler AG
 Robert B. Zoellick, president, The World Bank Group

External links
 Official site

2010 conferences
2010 in international relations
2010